Tourism in Spain is a major contributor to national economic life, contributing to about 11.8% of Spain's GDP (in 2017). Ever since the 1960s and 1970s, the country has been a popular destination for summer holidays, especially with large numbers of tourists from the United Kingdom, Ireland, Turkey, France, Germany, Italy, the Benelux, and the United States, among others. Accordingly, Spain's foreign tourist industry has grown into the second-biggest in the world. 

In 2019, Spain was the second most visited country in the world, recording 83.7 million tourists which marked the seventh consecutive year of record-beating numbers. Due to the coronavirus pandemic, in the first eleven months of year 2020 only 18.3 million tourists visited Spain. These dramatic figures are devastating for the tourism sector and are a reflection of what will be the worst year for this industry in terms of income ever recorded.

Spain ranks first among 140 countries in the biannual Travel and Tourism Competitiveness Index published by the World Economic Forum in 2019, matching the top position already achieved in 2017 and 2015.

The World Tourism Organization has its headquarters in Madrid.

According to The Economist 2005 year list, Spain has the world's 10th highest quality of life.

Arrivals by country

Most visitors arriving to Spain on a short-term basis were from the following countries:

Transport 

Spain's national airline is Iberia, but the country can be flown into on many international passenger airlines and charter airlines.

Tourists also arrive in Spain by road, rail and over the water. Spanish freeways interconnecting the touristic cities are also linked with the French freeway network across the Pyrenees. The main train operator is Renfe, including AVE (Spanish high speed train) or Talgo intercity services. Spain's high-speed rail link is the largest in Europe and second largest in the world after China. There is also a number of high-end tourism oriented hotel-train services, such as Transcantábrico.

Summer resorts and beaches 

This type of tourism was the first to be developed in Spain, and today, generates the most income for the Spanish economy.
The mild climate during the whole year and the extensive sandy beaches of the Mediterranean and Atlantic Ocean as well as of its two archipelagoes (the Balearic Islands and the Canary Islands respectively) have been attracting tourists from Northern Europe for decades. The leading source markets of Spanish beach tourism are the UK (around 24% of the total arrivals in Spain in recent years), Germany and France (around 15-16% each), followed by Scandinavia and Italy (around 7% each) and the Netherlands (around 5%).

The most popular Spanish mainland coasts are on its Mediterranean side, and include, from north to south clockwise:

The Costa Brava, the Costa Daurada and the Costa del Maresme, in the Autonomous Community of Catalonia, very popular with visitors from France as well as inland Spain, with notable resorts like Salou and the city of Barcelona.
The Costa Blanca, (one of the most developed coastal areas of Spain, extremely popular for tourists from the United Kingdom and Germany, with Benidorm as the leading summer city of Spain) and the Costa del Azahar are both in the Valencian Community.
The Costa Cálida in the Region of Murcia and the Mar Menor, a lagoon by the Mediterranean sea.
The Costa de Almería, the Costa Tropical, the Costa del Sol and the Costa de la Luz, all in the community of Andalusia. Some of the summer destinations here are renowned worldwide, such as Marbella in Málaga Province or Sotogrande in Cádiz province, both destinations for tourists and summer residents with big purchasing power. The city of Málaga is a notable Costa del Sol destination and also one of the largest harbours in Spain and frequented by cruise ships.

Spain's two archipelagoes, the Balearic Islands off the mainland coast in the Mediterranean and the volcanic Canary Islands in the Atlantic, are also both very popular destinations with Spaniards and Europeans.

In addition to the summer tourism, other modalities like cultural and monumental tourism congresses, sport or fun tourism have been developed in these areas, including such famous cities as Barcelona and Valencia, the biggest harbours of the Spanish Mediterranean coast.

Many coastal or island places also have great ecological and natural importance. Theme Parks like Terra Mítica, Tibidabo Amusement Park, Tivoli World and the resort PortAventura World or diverse water-fun parks are also popular.

In 2014 Spain broke its own record of blue flag beaches, achieving 681 flags and becoming the leader in the Northern Hemisphere. Spain is also the leader in blue flags for marinas.

Cultural tourism, business tourism 

As a crossroads of several civilizations, Spain offers a number of historical cities and towns. Major destinations include Spain's two largest cities: Madrid and Barcelona, which stand as two of the leading city destinations in Europe. Both offer a matchless number of attractions and their importance in commerce, education, entertainment, media, fashion, science, sports and arts contribute to their status as two of the world's major global cities.
Fifteen Spanish cities have been declared World Heritage Cities by the UNESCO:
Alcalá de Henares, Ávila, Baeza, Cáceres, Córdoba, Cuenca, Ibiza, Mérida, Salamanca, San Cristóbal de La Laguna, Santiago de Compostela, Segovia, Tarragona, Toledo and Úbeda . As of October 2016, Spain has 45 total sites inscribed on the list, third only to Italy (51) and China (50). Of these 45 sites, 40 are cultural, 3 are natural, and 2 are mixed (meeting both cultural and natural criteria), as determined by the organization's selection criteria.
Other first-class destinations are Seville, Granada, Santander, Oviedo, Gijón, Bilbao and San Sebastián. All of them with historical landmarks and a lively cultural agenda.

Student programs 

Besides hosting some of the most renowned business schools in the world such as IE Business School, ESADE or IESE Business School, Spain is a popular destination for students from abroad. In particular, during the 2010–11 academic year Spain was the European country receiving the most Erasmus Programme students.

Religion 

Spain is an important place for Catholicism. In fact, some of the holiest places for the Catholic Church are in Spain: city of Santiago de Compostela in Galicia (North-West Spain), the third holiest place after the Vatican City in Rome and Jerusalem. It is also the terminus of the Way of Saint James. Santo Toribio de Liébana, Cantabria (also in North Spain) is the fourth, followed by Caravaca de la Cruz at the South-East, (fifth holiest place). These places attract pilgrims and tourists from all over the world.
Religion also has found its artistic expression through the popular Holy Week processions, which become important in almost every town, Seville arguably holds some of the most elaborate processions for Holy Week.

Festivals 

Most festivals turn around patron saints, legends, local customs and folklore. Among the most singular ones stand out the Seville Fair (Feria de Abril in Spanish), the Romería de El Rocío in Almonte, Huelva, the world-famous running of the bulls in Pamplona, the Falles in Valencia, the Tomatina in Buñol, Valencia and the Fiestas del Pilar in Zaragoza.

The Carnival is also popular all over Spain, but especially in the Canary Islands (Carnival of Santa Cruz de Tenerife) and Cádiz. 
There are renowned movie festivals all over the country, the most recognizable being the famous San Sebastián International Film Festival, the Málaga Film Festival, the Seminci (Valladolid International Film Festival), the Mostra de Valencia and the Sitges Film Festival, the world's foremost international festival specializing in fantasy and horror movies. Music festivals includes the Sónar, the FIB, the Festimad, the Primavera Sound, the Bilbao BBK Live, the Monegros Desert Festival and the SOS 4.8 Festival.

Several cities have hosted international events: the 1888 Barcelona Universal Exposition, the 1929 Barcelona International Exposition, the 1992 Summer Olympics, all in Barcelona, the Universal fair of 1992 in Seville, the 2007 America's Cup in Valencia, and the Expo 2008 in Zaragoza. In addition, some Spanish cities have been or will be European Capital of Culture: Madrid in 1992; Santiago de Compostela in 2000, Salamanca in 2002, and San Sebastián in 2016.

Nightlife 

The nightlife in Spain is very attractive to both tourists and locals. Spain is known to have some of the best nightlife in the world. Big cities such as Madrid and Barcelona are favorites amongst the large and popular discothèques. For instance, Madrid is known as the number one party city for clubs such as Pacha and Kapital (seven floors), and Barcelona is famous for Opium and Sutton famous clubs. The discothèques in Spain are open until hours such as 7am. The Baleraric Islands, such as Ibiza and Mallorca, are known to be major party destinations, as well as favored summer resort and in Andalusia, Malaga, specially the area of the Costa del Sol.  Madrid is reputed to have a "vibrant nightlife". 

Ibiza is a relatively small island and its cities have become world-famous for their associations with tourism, nightlife, and the electronic music the island has originated. Ibiza has garnered the reputation as the "Party Capital of the world". It is well known for its summer club scene which attracts very large numbers of tourists, but the island's government and the Spanish Tourist Office have controversially been working to promote more family-oriented tourism. Noted clubs include Space, Privilege, Amnesia, Ushuaïa, Pacha, DC10, Eden, and Es Paradis. Ibiza is also home to the legendary "port" in Ibiza Town, a popular stop for many tourists and now a UNESCO World Heritage Site.

Majorca or Mallorca is an island located in the Mediterranean Sea. It is the largest island in the Balearic Islands archipelago, in Spain.

The capital of the island, Palma, is also the capital of the autonomous community of the Balearic Islands. The Cabrera Archipelago is administratively grouped with Majorca (in the municipality of Palma). The anthem of Majorca is La Balanguera.

Like the other Balearic Islands of Menorca, Ibiza, and Formentera, the island is an extremely popular holiday destination, particularly for tourists from Germany, Ireland, Poland, the Scandinavian countries, and the United Kingdom. The name derives from Latin insula maior, "larger island"; later Maiorica, "the larger one" in comparison to Menorca, "the smaller one".

Winter tourism

Spain is a generally mountainous country, with well-known ski resorts located in several parts of the country, including the Pyrenees, the Sistema Central, the Sistema Ibérico and Sierra Nevada.
For the most part, the main crest forms a massive divider between France and Spain, with the tiny country of Andorra sandwiched in between. The Crown of Aragon and the Kingdom of Navarre have historically extended on both sides of the mountain range, with small northern portions now in France and much larger southern parts now in Spain.

Sierra Nevada in Spain is a popular tourist destination, as its high peaks make skiing possible in one of Europe's most southerly ski resorts, in an area along the Mediterranean Sea predominantly known for its warm temperatures and abundant sunshine. At its foothills is found the city of Granada and, a little further, Almería and Málaga.

Parts of the range have been included in the Sierra Nevada National Park. The range has also been declared a biosphere reserve. The Sierra Nevada was formed during the Alpine Orogeny, a mountain-building event that also formed the European Alps to the east and the Atlas Mountains of northern Africa across the Mediterranean Sea to the south. The Sierra as observed today formed during the Paleogene and Neogene Periods (66 to 1.8 million years ago) from the collision of the African and Eurasian continental plates.

Nature and rural tourism 

Spain is the second largest country in the European Union. Its latitude puts part of the country in direct contact with the typical southern end of the Atlantic polar jet. Hence, Spain's geographical position allows for Atlantic fronts typically affecting its western and northern part whereas a Mediterranean influenced climate is generally prevalent in its eastern and southern parts, with transition climates linking both main bioclimatic regions. Additionally the presence of several mountain ranges ultimately shape the diverse landscape of Spain. Another remarkable feature of the country is its vast coast, as a result of being in a Peninsula; moreover, there is the coast of the two Spanish archipelagos: the Balearic Islands and the Canary Islands.

To date, Spain has a total of 15 National Parks, of which 10 are on the mainland, 1 in the Balearic Islands and 4 in the Canary Islands. Spain's most visited National Park is the Teide National Park in the Canary Islands, with 3,142,148 visitors in 2007 and crowned with the third largest Volcano in the world from its base, the Teide, with 3,718 meters above the sea level (also the highest point in Spain). The Teide also has the distinction of being the most visited national park in Europe and second in the world.

On top of that, by 2016 Spain is home to 48 biosphere reserves, covering 5.5 million hectares, almost 11% of the country, making Spain the world leader of such protected areas

Art and culture

Museums in Madrid

Madrid is considered one of the top European destinations concerning art museums. Best known is the Golden Triangle of Art, located along the Paseo del Prado and comprising three museums. The most famous one is the Museo del Prado, known for such highlights as Diego Velázquez's Las Meninas and Francisco de Goya's La maja vestida and La maja desnuda. The other two museums are the Thyssen Bornemisza Museum, established from a mixed private collection, and the Reina Sofia Museum, where Pablo Picasso's Guernica hangs, returning to Spain from New York after more than two decades.

The Museo del Prado is a museum and art gallery that features one of the world's finest collections of European art, from the 12th century to the early 19th century, based on the former Spanish Royal Collection. The collection currently comprises around 7,600 paintings, 1,000 sculptures, 4,800 prints and 8,200 drawings, in addition to a large number of works of art and historic documents. El Prado is one of the most visited museums in the world, and it is considered to be among the greatest museums of art. It has the best collection of paintings by Goya, Velázquez, El Greco, Patinir, José de Ribera, and other Spanish artists, as well as major collections of Rubens, Titian, Hieronymus Bosch, Rogier van der Weyden, Raphael, Tintoretto, Veronese, Caravaggio, Van Dyck, Albrecht Dürer, Claude Lorrain, Murillo and Zurbarán, among others.

The Museo Nacional Centro de Arte Reina Sofía (MNCARS) is the Spain's national museum of 20th-century art. The museum is mainly dedicated to Spanish art. Highlights of the museum include excellent collections of Spain's greatest 20th-century masters, Pablo Picasso, Salvador Dalí, Joan Miró, Juan Gris and Julio González. Certainly the most famous masterpiece in the museum is Picasso's painting Guernica. The Reina Sofía also hosts a free-access library specializing in art, with a collection of over 100,000 books, over 3,500 sound recordings and almost 1,000 videos.

The Thyssen-Bornemisza Museum is an art museum that fills the historical gaps in its counterparts' collections: in the Prado's case this includes Early Italian painting and works from the English, Dutch and German schools, while in the case of the Reina Sofia the Thyssen-Bornemisza collection, once the second largest private collection in the world after the British Royal Collection, includes Impressionists, Expressionists, and European and American paintings from the second half of the 20th century, with over 1,600 paintings.

The Royal Academy of Fine Arts of San Fernando currently functions as a museum and gallery that houses a fine art collection of paintings from the 15th to 20th centuries: Giovanni Bellini, Correggio, Rubens, Zurbarán, Murillo, Goya, Juan Gris, Pablo Serrano. The academy is also the headquarters of the Madrid Academy of Art. Francisco Goya was once one of the academy's directors, and, its alumni include Pablo Picasso, Salvador Dalí, Antonio López García, Juan Luna, and Fernando Botero.
 

 	
The Royal Palace of Madrid is the official residence of Felipe VI of Spain, but he uses it only for official acts. It is a baroque palace full of artworks and one of the largest European Royal Palaces, which is characterized by its luxurious rooms and its rich collections of armors and weapons, pharmaceutical, silverware, watches, paintings, tapestries and the most comprehensive collection of Stradivarius in the world

The National Archaeological Museum of Spain collection includes, among others, Pre-historic, Celtic, Iberian, Greek and Roman antiquities and medieval (Visigothic, Muslim and Christian) objects. Highlights include a replica of the Altamira cave (the first cave in which prehistoric cave paintings were discovered), Lady of Elche (an enigmatic polychrome stone bust), Lady of Baza (a famous example of Iberian sculpture), Biche of Balazote (an Iberian sculpture) and Treasure of Guarrazar (a treasure that represents the best surviving group of Early Medieval Christian votive offerings and the high point of Visigothic goldsmith's work).
 	
The Museum of the Americas is a national museum that holds artistic, archaeological and ethnographic collections from the whole Americas, ranging from the Paleolithic period to the present day. The permanent exhibit is divided into five major thematical areas: an awareness of the Americas, the reality of the Americas, society, religion and communication.
 	

 
The National Museum of Natural Sciences is the National Museum of Natural History of Spain. The research departments of the museum are: Biodiversity and Evolutionary Biology, Evolutionary Ecology, Paleobiology, Vulcanology and Geology.
	
The Naval Museum is managed by the Ministry of Defence. The Museum's mission is to acquire, preserve, investigate, report and display for study, education and contemplation, parts, sets and collections of historical, artistic, scientific and technical related to naval activity in order to disseminate the story sea of Spain; to help illustrate, highlight and preserve their traditions and promote national maritime awareness.
 	

 	
The Monastery of Las Descalzas Reales resides in the former palace of King Charles I of Spain and Isabel of Portugal. Their daughter, Joan of Austria, founded this convent of nuns of the Poor Clare order in 1559. Throughout the remainder of the 16th century and into the 17th century, the convent attracted young widowed or spinster noblewomen. Each woman brought with her a dowry. The riches quickly piled up, and the convent became one of the richest convents in all of Europe. It has many works of Renaissance and Baroque art, including a recumbent Christ by Gaspar Becerra, a staircase whose paintings were painted by unknown author (perhaps Velázquez) and they are considered of the masterpieces of Spanish illusionist painting, and Brussels tapestries inspired by paintings of Rubens.
 	
The Museum of Lázaro Galdiano houses an encyclopedic collection specializing in decorative arts.
 	
Apart from paintings and sculptures it displays 10th-century Byzantine enamel; Arab and Byzantine ivory chests; Hellenistic, Roman, medieval, renaissance, baroque and romantic jewelry; Pisanello and Pompeo Leoni medals; Spanish and Italian ceramics; Italian and Arab clothes and a collection of weapons including the sword of Pope Innocent VIII.
	
The Museo Nacional de Artes Decorativas (National Museum of Decorative Arts) is one of the oldest museums in the city. It illustrates the evolution of the called "minor arts" (furniture, ceramics and glass, textile, etc.). Its 60 rooms expones 15,000 objects, of the approximate 40,000 which it has.
 	
The Museo Nacional del Romanticismo (National Museum of Romanticism) contains a large collection of artefacts and art, focusing on daily life and customs of the 19th century, with special attention to the aesthetics about Romanticism.
 	
The Museo Cerralbo houses a private collection of ancient works of art, artifacts and other antiquities collected by Enrique de Aguilera y Gamboa, XVII Cerralbo Marquis.
 	
The National Museum of Anthropology provides an overview of the different cultures in the world, with objects and human remains from around the world, highlighting a Guanche mummy of the island of Tenerife.

	
The Museo Sorolla is located in the building in which the Valencian Impressionist painter had his home and workshop. The collection includes, in addition to numerous works of Joaquín Sorolla, a large number of objects that possessed the artist, including sculptures by Auguste Rodin.
 	
CaixaForum Madrid is a post-modern art gallery in the centre of Madrid. It is sponsored by the Catalan-Balearic bank la Caixa and located next to the Salón del Prado. Although the CaixaForum is a modern building, it also exhibits retrospectives of artists from earlier time periods and has evolved into one of the most visited museums in Madrid. It was constructed by the Swiss architects Herzog & de Meuron from 2001 to 2007, which combined an old unused industrial building and hollowed it out at the base and inside and placed on top further floors which are encased with rusted steel. Next to it is an art installation of green plants growing on the wall of the neighbouring house by French botanist Patrick Blanc. The red of the top floors with the green of the wall next to it form a contrast. The green is in reflection of the neighbouring Royal Botanical Gardens.

Other art galleries and museums in Madrid include:

 Royal Palace of Madrid
 Royal Academy of Fine Arts of San Fernando
 National Archaeological Museum of Spain
 Museum of the Americas
 National Museum of Natural Sciences
 Liria Palace
 Naval Museum
 Spanish Air Force Museum
 Monastery of Las Descalzas Reales
 Museum of Lázaro Galdiano
 Royal Palace of El Pardo
 Railway Museum
 Museum Sorolla
 CaixaForum Madrid

Museums in Barcelona

This is a list of museums in Barcelona (Catalonia) and in its surrounding metropolitan area.
Archaeology Museum of Barcelona (MAC)
Museu d'Art Contemporani de Barcelona (MACBA)
Museu del Modernisme Català MMCAT
CaixaForum Barcelona
Casa Àsia
Centre d'Art Santa Mònica (CASM)
Centre de Cultura Contemporània de Barcelona (CCCB)
Cosmocaixa Barcelona (former Museu de la Ciència de Barcelona)
Espai Gaudí (La Pedrera)
Fundació Antoni Tàpies
Olympic and Sports Museum Joan Antoni Samaranch
Fundació Joan Miró
Fundació Suñol
FC Barcelona Museum
Gracia Arts Project
Palau Reial de Pedralbes
Museu de Ceràmica
Museu de les Arts Decoratives
Museu Tèxtil i d'Indumentària
Museu d'Autòmates
Museu Barbier-Mueller d'Art Precolombí
Museu del Calçat
Museu de Cera de Barcelona
Museum of Natural Sciences of Barcelona
Museum of Natural Sciences of Barcelona (the main exhibition site, at the Forum Building)
 (the historical site where the Museum of Natural Sciences of Barcelona was founded in 1882, but contained the Geology Museum from 1924 to 2010)
, at the Castle of the Three Dragons (from 1920 to 2010: Zoology Museum)
Botanical garden of Barcelona

Museu del Clavegueram
Museu del Còmic i la Il·lustració
Museu Egipci de Barcelona
Museu de l'Eròtica de Barcelona
Museu Etnològic de Barcelona
Museu Frederic Marès
Museu Gaudí
Museu d'Història de Catalunya
Museu d'Història de la Ciutat
Centre d'Interpretació del Park Güell
Museu Marítim
Museu Militar de Barcelona (closed May 2009)
Museu de la Música de Barcelona
National Art Museum of Catalonia (MNAC)
Museu del Perfum - Fundació Planas Giralt
Museu Picasso
Museu Taurí
Museu de la Xocolata
Palau de la Virreina
Palau Robert
Sala Ciutat
Sagrada Familia

Other major museums in Spain

Bilbao Fine Arts Museum
Carmen Thyssen Museum in Málaga
City of Arts and Sciences in Valencia
Dalí Theatre and Museum in Figueres
Guggenheim Museum Bilbao
IVAM (Valencia)
Museo Picasso Málaga
Centro Pompidou Málaga
Museu de Belles Arts de València
National Museum of Sculpture in Valladolid
Museum of Fine Arts of Seville

Impact by Coronavirus 
In the early 2020, the country halted its tourism industry following the spread of coronavirus. Even as of May 2020, the country hasn't specified any fixed date for reopening to foreign tourists, but has mentioned hotspots like Balearic and Canary Islands to be the first to open. Spain reopened to fully vaccinated travellers from around the world on 7 Jun 2021, however due to the relatively late announcement of the reopening the initial increase in visitors was gradual.

See also
Paradores
Spanish cuisine

References

External links 

 Spanish Tourism Official Website in English
 Tourism in Catalonia
 

 
Spain